1-Octen-3-ol, octenol for short and also known as mushroom alcohol, is a chemical that attracts biting insects such as mosquitoes. It is contained in human breath and sweat, and it is believed that insect repellent DEET works by blocking the insects' octenol odorant receptors.

Natural occurrence
Octenol is produced by several plants and fungi, including edible mushrooms and lemon balm. Octenol is formed during oxidative breakdown of linoleic acid.

It is also a wine fault, defined as a cork taint, occurring in wines made with bunch rot contaminated grape.

Properties
1-Octen-3-ol is a secondary alcohol derived from 1-octene. It exists in the form of two enantiomers, (R)-(–)-1-octen-3-ol and (S)-(+)-1-octen-3-ol.

Synthesis 
Two possible lab syntheses of 1-octen-3-ol are:

 by the Grignard reaction of acrolein and amyl iodide
 by the selective reduction of 1-octen-3-one

Biochemically, 1-octen-3-ol is generated from the peroxidation of linoleic acid, catalyzed by a lipoxygenase, followed by cleavage of the resulting hydroperoxide with the help of a hydroperoxide lyase. This reaction takes place in cheese and is used in biotechnology to produce the (R)-isomer.

Uses
Octenol is used, sometimes in combination with carbon dioxide, to attract insects in order to kill them with certain electrical devices.

The name 'mushroom alcohol' is used because octenol is the main flavor component of mushrooms.

Health and safety
Octenol is approved by the U.S. Food and Drug Administration as a food additive. It is of moderate toxicity with an LD50 of 340 mg/kg.

In an animal study, octenol has been found to disrupt dopamine homeostasis and may be an environmental agent involved in parkinsonism.

See also 
 Olfactory receptor
 Oct-1-en-3-one, the ketone analog that gives blood on skin its typical metallic, mushroom-like smell
 1-Octen-3-yl acetate, the acetate ester of this compound

References 

Secondary alcohols
Alkenols
Vinyl compounds